This list includes Immovable Cultural Heritage sites in the Pirot District of Serbia.

Cultural monuments

Archaeological Sites

Historic Landmarks

Spatial Cultural-Historical Units

References

Cultural heritage of Serbia
Monuments and memorials in Serbia